The 2019 Israeli Basketball League Cup, for sponsorships reasons the Winner League Cup, is the 14th edition of the pre-season tournament of the Israeli Basketball Premier League.

On September 28, 2019, Hapoel Jerusalem  have won the title for the fifth time after an 84–83 dramatic win over Maccabi Tel Aviv in the Final. Suleiman Braimoh was named the Tournament MVP.

Bracket

First round

I. Nes Ziona vs. M.Haifa

M. Rishon LeZion vs. I. Nahariya

H. Be'er Sheva vs. H. Gilboa Galil

H. Tel Aviv vs. M. Ashdod

Quarterfinals

H. Eilat vs. I. Nes Ziona

H. Jerusalem vs. H. Be'er Sheva

H. Holon vs. I.Nahariya

M. Tel Aviv vs. H. Tel Aviv

Semifinals

H. Jerusalem vs. I. Nes Ziona

M. Tel Aviv vs. I. Nahariya

Final

M. Tel Aviv vs. H. Jerusalem

References

2019
League Cup